Munhar (born 5 October 1986) is an Indonesian professional footballer who plays as a defender for Liga 2 club PSPS Riau.

Honours

Club
Arema Cronus
 Menpora Cup: 2013
PSM Makassar
 Piala Indonesia: 2019

References

External links 
 
 Munhar at Liga Indonesia

Indonesian footballers
1986 births
Living people
People from Sidoarjo Regency
Sportspeople from East Java
Persema Malang players
Arema F.C. players
Bhayangkara F.C. players
Madura United F.C. players
PSM Makassar players
Persik Kediri players
PSPS Riau players
Indonesian Premier Division players
Liga 1 (Indonesia) players
Liga 2 (Indonesia) players
Association football defenders